Luca Orlando (born 26 December 1990) is an Italian football player who plays for Italian club U.S. Savoia 1908.

Club career
He made his Serie B debut for Salernitana in 2010.

References

External links
 

1990 births
People from Salerno
Sportspeople from the Province of Salerno
Living people
Italian footballers
U.S. Salernitana 1919 players
F.C. Pro Vercelli 1892 players
Paganese Calcio 1926 players
A.S.D. Portogruaro players
S.F. Aversa Normanna players
A.C.R. Messina players
S.S. Ischia Isolaverde players
Casertana F.C. players
A.C. Prato players
Matera Calcio players
Serie B players
Serie C players
Serie D players
Association football forwards
Footballers from Campania
21st-century Italian people